Jonathan Walker may refer to:

Jonathan Walker (abolitionist) (1799–1878), American reformer and abolitionist
Jonathan Walker (rugby league) (born 1991), currently playing for Castleford Tigers
Jonathan Hoge Walker (died 1824), United States federal judge
Jonathan Lloyd Walker (born 1967), English actor
Jon Walker (born 1985), American musician
Jonny Walker (soccer) (born 1974), American soccer goalkeeper

See also
Johnnie Walker (disambiguation)
John Walker (disambiguation)